The men's 400 metres event at the 2000 Asian Athletics Championships was held in Jakarta, Indonesia on 28–30 August.

Medalists

Results

Heats

Semifinals

Final

References

2000 Asian Athletics Championships
400 metres at the Asian Athletics Championships